Tornidae is a family of very small and minute sea snails with an operculum, marine gastropod mollusks in the clade Littorinimorpha. This family used to be known as the Vitrinellidae. Iredale has shown that the family Adeorbidae Monterosato, 1884 should be called Tornidae 

Family names cited with two dates (the second one in parentheses) are those ruled by Article 40(2) of ICZN. "If ... a family-group name was replaced before 1961 because of the synonymy of the type genus, the replacement name is to be maintained if it is in prevailing usage. A name maintained by virtue of this Article retains its own author [and date, the first date cited] but takes the priority of the replaced name [the date cited in parentheses, here alluding to Adeorbidae Monterosato, 1884]

General characteristics
The shells of the snails in this family are minute, colorless and glassy.

The paucispiral shell is umbilicated, auriform and depressed. The entire aperture is oblique. The shell has a simple columella, and a rounded, sharp outer lip. The corneous operculum is paucispiral, and has an eccentric nucleus.

The body of the animal differs from species in the family Trochidae by having no cirriform appendages of the foot. The radula is taenioglossate. (Thiele, 1925)

Subfamilies 
The following subfamilies were recognized in the 2005 taxonomy of Bouchet & Rocroi, but have now become alternate representations:
 Circulinae Fretter & Graham, 1962
 Torninae Sacco, 1896 (1884)
 Teinostomatinae Cossmann, 1917 (upgraded in 2021 to family level Teinostomatidae Cossmann, 1917)
 Vitrinellinae Bush, 1897

Genera
Genera in the family Tornidae include:
 † Adeorbella Briart & Cornet, 1887 
 Anticlimax Pilsbry & McGinty, 1946
 Aorotrema Schwengel & McGinty, 1942
 Canimarina Aguayo & Borro, 1946: synonym of Anticlimax Pilsbry & McGinty, 1946
 † Cantaurea Landau, da Silva & Heitz, 2016 
 Caperella Laseron, 1958
  Circlotoma Laseron, 1958
 Circuitus Rubio & Rolán, 2017
  Circulter Laseron, 1958
 Cochliolepis Stimpson, 1958
 Cyclostremiscus Pilsbry & Olsson, 1945
 Discopsis de Folin, 1870
 Discreliotia Laseron, 1958
 Elachorbis Iredale, 1914
 Episcynia Mörch, 1875
 Esmeralda Pilsbry & Olsson, 1952
 Laciniorbis Martens, 1897
 Lophocochlias Pilsbry, 1921
 Lydiphnis Melvill, 1906
 † Megatyloma Cossmann, 1888 
 Moeniatoma Laseron, 1958
 Neusas Warén & Bouchet, 2001
 Ovini Simone, 2013
 Panastoma Pilsbry & Olsson, 1945
 Parviturboides Pilsbry & McGinty, 1949
 Peripitoma Laseron, 1958
 Pleuromalaxis Pilsbry & McGinty, 1945
 † Pterolabrella Maxwell, 1969 
 Pygmaeorota Kuroda & Habe, 1954
 Scissilabra Bartsch, 1907
 Scrupus Finlay, 1927   
 Sigaretornus Iredale, 1936
 Solariorbis Conrad, 1865
 Tholostoma Laseron, 1958
 Tornus Turton & Kingston, 1830
 Tuberes Rubio & Rolán, 2017
 Uzumakiella Habe, 1958 
 Vitridomus Pilsbry & Olsson, 1945
 Vitrinorbis Pilsbry & Olsson, 1952
 Woodringilla Pilsbry & Olsson, 1951
Genera brought into synonymy
 Adeorbis S.V. Wood, 1842: synonym of Tornus Turton & Kingston, 1830
 Climacia Dall, 1903: synonym of  Anticlimax Pilsbry & McGinty, 1946
 Climacina Aguayo & Borro, 1946: synonym of  Anticlimax Pilsbry & McGinty, 1946
 Liochrysta Laseron, 1958: synonym of Pseudoliotia Tate, 1898
 Lioprora Laseron, 1958: synonym of Canimarina Aguayo & Borro, 1946
 Miralabrum Pilsbry & Olsson, 1945: synonym of Cyclostremiscus Pilsbry & Olsson, 1945
 Ponocyclus Pilsbry, 1953: synonym of Cyclostremiscus Pilsbry & Olsson, 1945
 Pygmaerota Kuroda & Habe, 1952: synonym of Pygmaeorota Kuroda & Habe, 1954
 Soyorota Habe, 1961: synonym of Circulus Jeffreys, 1865
Alternate representations
 Subfamily Circulinae Fretter & Graham, 1962 
 Subfamily Torninae Sacco, 1896 (1884) 
 Subfamily Vitrinellinae Bush, 1897

References

 Adam W. & Knudsen J. (1969). Quelques genres de mollusques prosobranches marins ou peu connus de l'Afrique occidentale. Bulletin de l'Institut Royal des Sciences Naturelles de Belgique 44(27): 1-69
 Backeljau, T. (1986). Lijst van de recente mariene mollusken van België [List of the recent marine molluscs of Belgium]. Koninklijk Belgisch Instituut voor Natuurwetenschappen: Brussels, Belgium. 106 pp.
Vaught, K.C. (1989). A classification of the living Mollusca. American Malacologists: Melbourne, FL (USA). . XII, 195 pp.
 Rolán E. & Rubio F. 2002. The family Tornidae (Gastropoda, Rissooidea) in the East Atlantic. Resenas Malacologicas 13 (Suplemento), 98 pp. Sociedad Española de Malacología
 Bouchet P. & Rocroi J.-P. (2005) Classification and nomenclator of gastropod families. Malacologia 47(1-2): 1-397
 Rubio, F., Fernandez-Garcés, R. & Rolán, E., 2011. The family Tornidae (Gastropoda, Rissooidea) in the Caribbean and neighboring areas. Iberus 29(2): 1-230
 
 Powell A. W. B., New Zealand Mollusca, William Collins Publishers Ltd, Auckland, New Zealand 1979 
 ZipCodeZoo

 
Truncatelloidea